Acromantis gestri, common name Sumatran Acromantis or Thailand boxer praying mantis, is a species of praying mantis found in Malaysia and Sumatra.

See also
List of mantis genera and species

References

Gestri
Mantodea of Southeast Asia
Insects of Indonesia
Insects of Malaysia
Fauna of Sumatra
Insects described in 1915